The United Refugee Organization is a non profit freelance organisation whose aim is to foster unity and promote forums, good will, and cohesive interactions between refugees from all backgrounds. It is a refugee body whose other objective is to help exhibit relevant information to needy refugees and a sharing platform on numerous issues affecting them. It was initially formed by a group of refugees in Leeds who despite their refugeeship entered into humanitarian voluntary actions like with organisations like Refugee Council, Leeds Noborder and other refugee endeavours. It was first known as Iranian Refugee Organization in Leeds(IROL/BIMARZ network) after which it consequently metamorphosed into (URO).

See also
Immigration
Refugee
No Border network
No person is illegal

External links
URO in Leeds website

Human rights organisations based in the United Kingdom